is a major railway station in Hakata-ku, Fukuoka, Japan. It is the largest and busiest railway terminal in Kyushu, and is a gateway to other cities in Kyushu for travelers coming from Honshu by rail travel. The San'yō Shinkansen from Osaka ends at this station.

The station was rebuilt in 2011. The main building was demolished and a new, larger station building, as well as office buildings and new platforms, was constructed. The station reconstruction project was initiated specifically for the Kyushu Shinkansen extension from Hakata to Shin-Yatsushiro Station which continues southward through its existing route to Kagoshima-Chūō Station. The new station building has a Hankyu Department Store, its first branch store in Kyushu, as a tenant, as well as other first-in-Kyushu branch retailers including Tokyu Hands.

Lines

Fukuhoku-Yutaka Line
Kagoshima Main Line
Kyushu Shinkansen 

San'yō Shinkansen
Hakata-Minami Line

Platforms

JR

Fukuoka City Subway
The subway station's symbol mark is a bolt of cloth with the traditional hakata-ori (:ja:博多織) pattern "Kenjō Hakata"(). Hakata-ori is a traditional woven silk textile of Hakata.

History

 11 December 1889: opened. The original station building was about 600 m north of the current position.
 1 December 1963: station reconstructed in present form raised above street level.
 10 March 1975: San'yō Shinkansen services began.
 22 March 1983: temporary Fukuoka City Subway station opened.
 3 March 1985: current Fukuoka City Subway station opened.
 3 March 2011: JR Hakata City opened.
 12 March 2011: Kyushu Shinkansen services begin.

Future plans 
The extension of the Fukuoka City Subway Nanakuma Line to Hakata Station is scheduled to begin operation on 27 March 2023.

Passenger statistics
In fiscal 2016, the station was used by an average of 121,370 passengers daily (boarding passengers only), and it ranked 1st among the busiest stations of JR Kyushu.

See also
 List of railway stations in Japan

References

External links

 Fukuoka City Subway at urbanrail.net
 Hataka Station (JR Kyushu) 
 Hataka Station (JR West) 
 Hakata Station (Fukuoka City Subway) 

Railway stations in Fukuoka, Fukuoka
Sanyō Shinkansen
Railway stations in Japan opened in 1889